Powerflo is an American heavy metal band from Los Angeles, California, formed in 2016. The band's current lineup consists of lead vocalist Senen Reyes, lead guitarist and backing vocalist Rogelio "Roy" Lozano, rhythm guitarist and vocalist Billy Graziadei, and bassist and backing vocalist Christian Olde Wolbers.

History
The band's history can be traced back to the 1990s, where the band members would often collaborate - such as Senen "Sen Dog" Reyes and Billy Biohazard performing on Biohazard's State Of The World Address album with the hit single How it is, or Wolbers and Lozano appearing in Cypress Hill albums Skull & Bones and Stoned Raiders. In 2015, Roy Lozano played some demos to Senen Reyes on a ride to the airport, setting the foundations for Powerflo.

The name of the band comes from a comment Lozano made about Reyes's vocal tracking for the upcoming album. Describing their sound as a "cross between Iron Maiden, Black Sabbath and Cypress Hill", they first unveiled the band on March 1, 2017 while recording their self-titled debut album. On May 2, 2017, they released the first single "Resistance" via Metal Injection. In launching the first single, Reyes indicated that this is a long term project and that future Powerflo albums will be released after their self-titled Produced by Billy Graziadei and Josh Lynch is released, while also announcing a June 23 release date.

On June 2, 2017, Powerflo released their next music video (directed by Graziadei) for "Victims of Circumstance", a song influenced by the TV series The First 48. At the same time, they announced their first show at The Viper Room in Los Angeles on June 15. On May 31, "Resistance" was chosen as the official theme song for WWE NXT's programming.

In July 2017, Powerflo released another video for the single Where I Stay (directed by Jeremy Danger and Travis Shinn) which quickly reached over 1 million views within weeks of release. The band spent the summer and fall touring with friends from San Diego P.O.D. and LA family Brujeria

Powerflo released the next video for "Less than Human" (directed by Graziadei) in December 2017 and went on tour with Prong in the spring of 2018.

Members

Current members
 Senen Reyes – lead vocals (2016–present)
 Roy Lozano – lead guitar, backing vocals (2016–present)
 Billy Graziadei – rhythm guitar, co-lead vocals (2016–present)
 Christian Olde Wolbers – bass, backing vocals (2016–present)
Touring members
 Fred Aching – drums (2018–present)
Former members
 Fernando Schaefer – drums (2016–2018)

Discography

Albums
Powerflo (2017)

EPs
Bring That Shit Back! (2018)

References

External links
 

2016 establishments in California
Heavy metal musical groups from California
Heavy metal supergroups
Musical groups established in 2016
Musical quintets
Rap metal musical groups